Juventus Training Center (JTC) may refer to:

Juventus Training Center (Vinovo), an Italian football facility in Vinovo, 14 kilometres from the city of Turin
Juventus Training Center (Turin), an Italian football facility in the city of Turin